Interleukin 9 receptor (IL9R) also known as CD129 (Cluster of Differentiation 129) is a type I cytokine receptor. IL9R also denotes its human gene.

The protein encoded by this gene is a cytokine receptor that specifically mediates the biological effects of interleukin 9 (IL9). The functional IL9 receptor complex requires this protein as well as the interleukin 2 receptor, gamma (IL2RG), a common gamma subunit shared by the receptors of many different cytokines. The ligand binding of this receptor leads to the activation of various JAK kinases and STAT proteins, which connect to different biologic responses.  This gene is located at the pseudoautosomal regions of X and Y chromosomes. Genetic studies suggested an association of this gene with the development of asthma. Multiple pseudogenes on chromosome 9, 10, 16, and 18 have been described. Alternatively spliced transcript variants encoding distinct isoforms have been reported.

Interactions
Interleukin-9 receptor has been shown to interact with YWHAZ.

See also
 Cluster of differentiation

References

Further reading

External links
 

Type I cytokine receptors
Clusters of differentiation